2003 Continental Championships may refer to:

African Championships
 Multisport: 2003 All-Africa Games

Asian Championships
 Athletics: 2003 Asian Athletics Championships
 Football (soccer): 2002–03 AFC Champions League
 Multisport: 2003 Asian Winter Games

European Championships
 Basketball: EuroBasket 2003
 Figure skating: 2003 European Figure Skating Championships
 Football (soccer): 2002–03 UEFA Champions League
 Football (soccer): 2002–03 UEFA Cup
 Football (soccer): 2003 UEFA European Under-17 Championship
 Football (soccer): 2002–03 UEFA Women's Cup
 Volleyball: 2003–04 CEV Champions League

Oceanian Championships
 Football (soccer): 2003 OFC Women's Championship

Pan American Championships/North American Championships
 Football (soccer): 2003 CONCACAF Champions' Cup
 Football (soccer): 2003 CONCACAF Gold Cup
Multisport: 2003 Pan American Games

South American Championships
 Football (soccer): 2003 Copa Libertadores

See also
 2003 World Championships (disambiguation)
 2003 World Junior Championships (disambiguation)
 2003 World Cup (disambiguation)
 Continental championship (disambiguation)

Continental championships